Õru is a small borough in Valga Parish, Valga County, southern Estonia. Between 1992 and 2017, prior to the administrative reform of Estonian local governments, it was the administrative centre of Õru Parish. As of 2011 Census, the settlement's population was 178.

The Tartu–Valga road (part of E264) passes through Õru.

Õru was established in the 1950s–60s as the centre of the Vaiga Sovkhoz.

Besides local government there are kindergarten-elementary school, library and post office located in Õru.

References 

Boroughs and small boroughs in Estonia